Zotalemimon puncticollis is a species of beetle in the family Cerambycidae. It was described by Stephan von Breuning in 1949.

References

puncticollis
Beetles described in 1949